The barred antthrush (Chamaeza mollissima) is a species of bird in the family Formicariidae.

It is found in Bolivia, Colombia, Ecuador and Peru. Its natural habitat is subtropical or tropical moist montane forest.

References

barred antthrush
Birds of the Northern Andes
barred antthrush
barred antthrush
Taxonomy articles created by Polbot